Denis Flahaut (born 28 November 1978 in Valenciennes) is a French former professional road racing cyclist.

Major results

2004
 Tour du Faso
1st Stages 3, 8 & 10
 6th GP de Dourges
2006
 2nd Omloop van de Vlaamse Scheldeboorden
 8th Nationale Sluitingprijs
 8th Grand Prix de la Ville de Lillers
2007
 1st Delta Profronde
 1st Neuseen Classics
 1st Vlaamse Havenpijl
 1st Stage 3 OZ Wielerweekend
 3rd Kampioenschap van Vlaanderen
 6th Omloop van de Vlaamse Scheldeboorden
2008
 1st Stage 5 Vuelta a Andalucía
 2nd Trofeo Cala Millor
 5th Trofeo Mallorca
2009
 1st Meiprijs - Ereprijs Victor De Bruyne
 1st Nationale Sluitingprijs - Putte - Kapellen
 3rd GP de Denain Porte du Hainaut
 3rd Antwerpse Havenpijl
 6th Memorial Rik Van Steenbergen
 7th Omloop van het Waasland
2010
 1st GP de Denain
 1st Omloop van het Waasland
 1st Tallinn–Tartu GP
 3rd Arno Wallaard Memorial
 4th Beverbeek Classic
 7th Omloop der Kempen
 9th Ronde Pévéloise
2011
 1st Grand Prix de la Ville de Lillers
 3rd Ronde Pévéloise
 5th GP de Denain
2012
 1st Stage 1 Paris–Arras Tour
 4th Road race, National Road Championships
 7th GP de Denain

References

External links

1978 births
Living people
French male cyclists
Sportspeople from Valenciennes
Cyclists from Hauts-de-France
21st-century French people